Peter Thomas may refer to:

Sportspeople
 Pete Thomas (American football) (born 1991), American football player
 Peter Thomas (footballer, born 1932), Welsh footballer
 Peter Thomas (footballer, born 1944), Irish international footballer
 Peter Thomas (footballer, born 2004), English footballer
 Peter Thomas (cricketer, born 1952), English cricketer
 Peter Thomas (cricketer, born 1964), English cricketer
 Peter Thomas (Grenadian cricketer) (born 1954), West Indian cricketer
 Peter Thomas (rower) (born 1945), British rower

Musicians
 Pete Thomas (drummer) (born 1954), English
 Pete Thomas (saxophonist), English musician, music producer and composer
 Peter Thomas (composer) (1925–2020), German composer and arranger
 Peter Thomas (musician), American pop songwriter, producer and singer

Others
 Peter Thomas (saint) (1305–1366), Latin Patriarch of Constantinople
 Peter Thomas, Baron Thomas of Gwydir (1920–2008), Welsh Conservative politician
 Peter Thomas (announcer) (1924–2016), American narrator of television programs
 Peter Thomas (actor) (1936–2017), British actor
 Peter H. Thomas (born 1938), Canadian entrepreneur, author, public speaker and educator
 Peter R. Thomas (born 1954), American artist, author, and papermaker
 Peter James Thomas (born 1961), British entrepreneur and academic
 Peter K. Thomas, American teacher of restorative dentistry
 Peter M. Thomas, American attorney, businessman and banker

See also